Saint Glyceria (died ca. 177 in Heraclea, Propontis) was a Roman virgin of the early church.

According to Christian tradition, she was forced to pay tribute to a stone statue of Jupiter but it was destroyed while she stood before it. The virgin was imprisoned for this, then sentenced to be torn apart by wild animals. She, however, was not torn apart. Before the animals could render her any harm, Glyceria died a virgin martyr in Heraclea. Her relics reputedly poured forth the substance known as the Oil of Saints, and her name means "sweetness".

She is primarily recognized as a saint in Eastern Christianity and the Roman Catholic Church. Her feast day is 13 May in Eastern Orthodox liturgics.

External links 
 https://web.archive.org/web/20081006123136/http://saints.sqpn.com/saintg6e.htm
 http://www.catholic.org/saints/saint.php?saint_id=3578
 http://www.antiochian.org/node/18611
  Ἡ Ἁγία Γλυκερία ἡ Μάρτυς. ΜΕΓΑΣ ΣΥΝΑΞΑΡΙΣΤΗΣ.

2nd-century births
2nd-century Christian martyrs
177 deaths
Myroblyte saints